Maxwell Xolani Rani is a professional African dancer and choreographer. He is also a professor at the University of Cape Town in the School of Dance.

Childhood 
Maxwell's grandparents raised him. His family is from a village in the Eastern Cape called Cofimvaba and migrated in the 60s to settle in Cape Town for "greener pastures." Maxwell was born and raised in Nyanga Township in Cape Town. He attended the Zolani Centre in Nyanga where he became a full-time boy scout of the fourth Den.

Early involvement in dance 
While he was attending the boy scouts, he was also attending Zulu dance training and dancing in Zolani Centre in Nyanga. Eventually he gave up boy scouts and focused on dancing. His aunt worked for a ballet dance couple and they were familiar with Maxwell because he was with them at weekends. One of them, Professor David Pool, who was the head of department of UCT School of Dance, was the Director of Cape Town City Ballet for a long time.  He showed interest in dancing Maxwell was involved with in the Township. David ended up coming to the Township to join in and got introduced to other dance forms. Maxwell learned about choreography, contemporary and ballet. A lot knowledge was acquired as far as dance discipline is concerned.

Later schooling 
Maxwell attended high school in Nyanga Township at a school called Oscar Mpetha which was called Sizamile then. He then went to a private School which was a French school, where all subjects were in French. He attended college overseas in times of apartheid, including the Paris Institute and Greenwich in London, but ultimately ended up at University of Cape Town. He also freelanced as an established artist overseas.

Dance career 
Maxwell's dance career started from Nyanga when David Poole was working with them, because at that time he had started performing professionally in theaters and other productions. It rose high when he went overseas to France, Canada and London. He was trained by many acclaimed teachers and dancers from Germaine Acogny to H. Patten in London. His experience in performing overseas taught him different styles and influences that made him an established South African Artist overseas and at home in South Africa.

He started teaching dance overseas as an extramural thing as he was a full-time student and dancer. But his right knee made him to think hard about teaching as he was not consistent in terms of physio. During that time he was still in London. He taught African dance overseas in Brazil, Beijing, Senegal, Jamaica, and the USA (Philadelphia, Wisconsin, and North Carolina). One day he received a letter requesting to be a “guinea pig” at the University of Cape Town School of Dance. He was to be the first African dance major student with a full scholarship. After giving a thought about the offer, he then accepted it because he wanted to return home and be a formal and accredited dance teacher with a qualification. He attended four years and then was planning on returning overseas when the head of the department, Professor Elizabeth Triegaardt, proposed that he stay and build the course to another level and stretch it a little bit by using his contacts and dance experience. It took a lot of negotiations to stay as he was dying to return to his familiar lifestyle because he realised lots of things such as “how far backwards his country was in the performance industry”. Though, at the time, South Africa's dance industry was not relatively active, he considers the country to be of much progress in recent times.

References 

Living people
South African male dancers
Year of birth missing (living people)